I Can Get It for You Wholesale is a 1962 musical with music and lyrics by Harold Rome.

I Can Get It for You Wholesale:
I Can Get It for You Wholesale, a 1937 novel by Jerome Weidman, and the basis for the musical
I Can Get It for You Wholesale (film), a 1951 film adaptation of the novel
I Can Get It for You Wholesale (album), the musical's cast album

See also
"We Can Remember It for You Wholesale", a 1966 short story by Philip K. Dick